Albert Tertius Myburgh (26 December 1936 – 2 December 1990) was a South African journalist and editor, best known as editor of the Sunday Times between 1975-1990.

Background
Myburgh was the son of Albert Lambert Myburgh. He was educated at Dale College Boys' High School in King William's Town in the Eastern Cape and later studied at the University of Cape Town. Between 1965-1966, he was a Nieman Fellow of journalism at Harvard University in Massachusetts, United States. In the United States he specialized in the fields of politics, economics and foreign affairs.

Career
Myburgh's began his career at The Friend newspaper in Bloemfontein followed by two years working at the London office of the Argus newspaper group. He later returned to South Africa and became political and parliamentary reporter for The Star in Johannesburg in 1963. In 1967 he became assistant editor of the Daily News. Between 1971 and March 1975 he served as editor of the Pretoria News and in April 1975 became editor of the largest newspaper in South Africa, The Sunday Times.

Myburgh was also published by international titles, as a South African associate for the New York Times and Time. He also contributed to the Christian Science Monitor, the Financial Times and the Daily Express.

References

1936 births
1990 deaths
South African journalists
White South African people
University of Cape Town alumni
People from the Eastern Cape
Nieman Fellows
20th-century journalists